Typha elephantina  is a plant species widespread across northern Africa and southern Asia. It is considered native in Algeria, Egypt, Libya, Mauritania, Senegal, Chad, Eritrea, Ethiopia, Turkmenistan, Tajikistan, Uzbekistan, Palestine, Israel, Saudi Arabia, Yemen, Yunnan, Assam, Bangladesh, India, Bhutan, Nepal, Pakistan and Burma. It grows in freshwater marshes and on the banks of lakes and streams.

References

elephantina
Freshwater plants
Flora of Tajikistan
Flora of Uzbekistan
Flora of the Indian subcontinent
Flora of Palestine (region)
Flora of Israel
Flora of Saudi Arabia
Flora of Yemen
Flora of Yunnan
Flora of Turkmenistan
Flora of Ethiopia
Flora of Eritrea
Flora of Chad
Flora of Senegal
Flora of Mauritania
Flora of Libya
Flora of Egypt
Flora of Algeria
Flora of China
Plants described in 1832